Wanglin Lowangdong is an Indian politician from the state of Arunachal Pradesh.

Lowangdong was elected from Borduria-Bogapani seat in the 2019 Arunachal Pradesh Legislative Assembly election, standing as an Indian National Congress candidate. In terms of educational qualification, he is a graduate (B.A.).

He was born into the Nocte Tribe of Borduria, Arunachal Pradesh and at present he is also the Paramount Chief of Nocte Tribe.

See also
Arunachal Pradesh Legislative Assembly

References

External links
Wanglin Lowangdong profile
MyNeta Profile
Janpratinidhi Profile

Indian National Congress politicians
Living people
People's Party of Arunachal politicians
Arunachal Pradesh MLAs 2019–2024
Arunachal Pradesh MLAs 2014–2019
Year of birth missing (living people)
People from Tirap district
Naga people